David William Shean (July 9, 1883 – May 22, 1963) was an American professional baseball second baseman. He played from  through  for the Philadelphia Athletics (1906), Philadelphia Phillies (1908–1909), Boston Doves (1909–1910, 1912), Chicago Cubs (1911), Cincinnati Reds (1917) and Boston Red Sox (1918–1919) of Major League Baseball (MLB). He was born in Arlington, Massachusetts.

A graduate of Fordham University, Shean was a well-traveled utility who spent 14 years in baseball, nine of them in the major leagues. His most productive season came in 1918 with Boston, when he posted career-numbers in batting average (.264) and runs (58), while leading the American League hitters with 36 sacrifice hits. He also was a member of the World Champions Red Sox in the 1918 Series.

In a nine-season career, Shean was a .228 hitter (495-for-2167) with six home runs and 167 RBI in 630 games, including 225 runs, 59 doubles, 23 triples, and 66 stolen bases. In six Series games, he hit .211 (4-for-19) with a double, two runs, and one stolen base.

Following his baseball career, Shean was president of Nathan Robbins Company, a poultry concern. Shean died at the age of 79 in Boston, Massachusetts, after suffering injuries in an automobile accident.

External links
Baseball Reference
Retrosheet
Chronology
Obituary

Boston Braves players
Boston Doves players
Boston Red Sox players
Chicago Cubs players
Cincinnati Reds players
Philadelphia Athletics players
Philadelphia Phillies players
Major League Baseball second basemen
Fordham Rams baseball players
Baseball players from Massachusetts
1883 births
1963 deaths
Road incident deaths in Massachusetts
Minor league baseball managers
Montreal Royals players
Williamsport Millionaires players
Providence Grays (minor league) players